The 2nd Soccer Bowl the second edition of the Soccer Bowl, and a post-season college soccer championship game between the Penn State Nittany Lions and the Purdue Boilermakers on January 1, 1951, at the Sportsman's Park in St. Louis, Missouri. The match ended in a 3–1 victory with Penn State claiming their second Soccer Bowl, and their 11th claimed national men's soccer championship. The game was used to determine the champion of the 1950 ISFA season, which predated the NCAA as the premier organizing body of collegiate soccer, and represented the concluding game of the season for both teams.

The match originally was going to feature Penn State playing the South Florida Bulls club soccer team in the final, but the Bulls were unable to make the trip to St. Louis, causing Purdue to serve as an alternate.

Background 
Historically, Penn State had been heralded as one of the top college soccer programs in the United States from the late 1920s into the late 1940s. From 1926 until 1950 head coach Bill Jeffrey had the Penn State program accumulate a record of 138–20–24. 

Unlike Penn State, Purdue's men's soccer team was not a varsity team sponsored by the university, but a club team sponsored by the Purdue University students. Since at the time the NCAA did not sanction the sport, the ISFA permitted varsity and club teams to compete against each other.

The match 
The match was kicked off at 2:45 p.m. Central Time as part of a triple-header of soccer matches held at Sportsman's Park. The opening matches featured local high school soccer programs in the St. Louis metro area. At noon St. Joseph's Home took on St. Edwards for the C.Y.C. Parochial title. At 1:15 p.m., Kendrick Prep Seminary School took on DeAndreis for the championship game of the Christmas Week High School Tournament.

The humidity was around 82% and winds came from the South at 16 miles per hour.

The match was played in four, 22-minute quarters as opposed to 45-minute halves, as at the time it was the standard U.S.S.F.A rules in an attempt to "Americanize" the game. Pete Garcia was the center referee, while Justin Keenoy was an assist referee.

Details

Legacy 
The Soccer Bowl championship gave Penn State their second ever Soccer Bowl, and their 11th claimed National championship. Despite the title, the ISFA claimed West Chester the national champions concluding the season given their undefeated 8–0–0 record, in which one of their victories was against Penn State, which drew ire from Penn State and South Florida's programs. Despite this recognition by the ISFA, it is not recognized as a national title by the NCAA, although both South Florida, Penn State, and West Chester declare themselves national champions, which is a claim recognized by the American Soccer History Archives.

References

External links 
 Penn State Men's Varsity Soccer
 Purdue Men's Club Soccer

Championship Game
1951
1951 in sports in Missouri
Penn State Nittany Lions men's soccer
Purdue Boilermakers men's soccer
January 1951 sports events in the United States
Soccer in St. Louis